Marie Ragnhild Takvam (née Skylstad; December 5, 1926 – January 28, 2008) was a Norwegian poet, novelist, writer of children's books, playwright and actress.

Biography
Takvam was born at Ørsta in Møre og Romsdal, Norway.  Her parents were Johan Skylstad (1883-1974) and Martha Sperre (1901-1983).
She grew up at Hjørundfjord in Sunnmøre as the eldest of five siblings of a farm family. After graduation artium at Nordfjordeid in 1945, she moved to Oslo together with her future husband Johannes Takvam  (1925-2003).  They were married in 1950; their  marriage dissolved in 1975. Takvam studied psychology at the University of Oslo, but had to cancel her studies when her eldest son was born. She was the mother of  journalist Magnus Takvam.

In the 1950s and 1960s, Takvam worked as program leader for the children's programming at NRK.
She published 12 poetry collections over a 45-year period. She made her literary debut in 1952 with the poetry collection Dåp under sju stjerner. Among her other collections are Merke etter liv from 1962, Brød og tran from 1969, and Falle og reise seg att from 1980.

Marie Takvam was awarded several literary  including the Dobloug Prize in 1983, and the Nynorsk Literature Prize in 1997 and Melsomprisen in 1998.
She died in 2008 at Ljabruhjemmet in Oslo and was buried at Vestre gravlund.

Bibliography 
 Dåp under sju stjerner, 1952
 Syngjande kjelder, 1954
 Merke etter liv, 1962
 Mosaikk i lys, 1965
 Brød og tran, 1969
 Auger, hender, 1975
 Dansaren, 1975
 Falle og reise seg att, 1980
 Brevet frå Alexandra, 1981
 Aldrande drabantby, 1987
 Rognebær, 1990
 Dikt i samling, 1997

Filmography

 Åpenbaringen (1977)
 Det tause flertall (1977)
 Hvem har bestemt? (1978)
 Løperjenten (1981)

References

1926 births
2008 deaths
People from Møre og Romsdal
University of Oslo alumni
Norwegian children's writers
Norwegian women novelists
Norwegian film actresses
Norwegian women children's writers
Norwegian women dramatists and playwrights
Norwegian women poets
20th-century Norwegian novelists
20th-century Norwegian dramatists and playwrights
20th-century Norwegian women writers
20th-century Norwegian poets
Dobloug Prize winners
Burials at Vestre gravlund